The Prairie View A&M Lady Panthers basketball team is the women's basketball team that represents Prairie View A&M University in Prairie View, Texas, United States. The school's team currently competes in the Southwestern Athletic Conference (SWAC).

Postseason appearances

NCAA Division I Tournament appearances

WNIT appearances

References

External links